A constitutional referendum was held in Panama on 24 April 1983. Voters were asked whether they approved of a series of amendments to the 1972 constitution. A reported 87.8% voted in favour, with a turnout of 66.8%.

Results

References

Panama
Referendums in Panama
1983 in Panama
Constitutional referendums